Mula Gori Tehsil is a subdivision located in Khyber District, Khyber Pakhtunkhwa, Pakistan. It is located among the Tatara hills. The population is 180,160 according to the 2017 census. The population mostly belongs to the Mulagori tribe of the Pashtuns.

See also 
 Mullagori
 List of tehsils of Khyber Pakhtunkhwa

References 

Tehsils of Khyber Pakhtunkhwa
Populated places in Khyber District